Erik Olin Wright (February 9, 1947 – January 23, 2019) was an American analytical Marxist sociologist at the University of Wisconsin–Madison, specializing in social stratification and in egalitarian alternative futures to capitalism. He was known for diverging from classical Marxism in his breakdown of the working class into subgroups of diversely held power and therefore varying degrees of class consciousness. Wright introduced novel concepts to adapt to this change of perspective including deep democracy and interstitial revolution.

Early life and education
Born on February 9, 1947, in Berkeley, California, Wright was raised in Lawrence, Kansas. His parents, M. Erik Wright and Beatrice Ann (Posner) Wright, were both psychology professors at the University of Kansas. He received two Bachelor of Arts degrees, the first with a social studies major at Harvard College in 1968 and the second with a history major at Balliol College, University of Oxford, in 1970. Wright completed a Ph.D. in sociology at the University of California, Berkeley in 1976 and joined the Department of Sociology at University of Wisconsin–Madison the same year.

Career
Wright began making contributions to the intellectual community in the mid-1970s, along with a whole generation of young academics who were radicalized by the Vietnam War and the civil rights movement.

At the University of Wisconsin–Madison, Wright supervised the dissertations of numerous young scholars who proceeded to become notable sociologists and politicians, among whom are included Wilmot James, César Rodríguez Garavito, and Vivek Chibber. Wright also served on the dissertation committees of scholars who go on to make considerable contributions to the fields of social stratification, social policy, and inequality including Gøsta Esping-Andersen, former American Sociological Association president Eduardo Bonilla-Silva, and the late Devah Pager.

Throughout Wright's career, he was solicited by other universities to join their sociology faculty. One notable such recruitment attempt occurred at Harvard University in 1981. Among Wright's supporters were Harrison White, who respected Wright's work despite opposition to Wright's Marxist political commitments. Wright's opponents at Harvard included Daniel Bell and George Homans, as well as university president Derek Bok who purportedly blocked the department's attempt to recruit Wright. Harvard's attempt to recruit Wright coincided with its decision to deny tenure in 1981 to Theda Skocpol, a decision that was later reversed following controversy over accusations of gender discrimination. 

In 2012, Wright was elected President of the American Sociological Association.

Personal life 
Wright was also an avid fiddle player, often encouraging guests to square dance at parties.

Wright died on January 23, 2019, from acute myeloid leukemia at a hospital in Milwaukee, Wisconsin, aged 71.

Thought

Social classes 
Wright has been described as an "influential new left theorist". His work was concerned mainly with the study of social classes, and in particular with the task of providing an update to and elaboration of the Marxist concept of class, in order to enable Marxist and non-Marxist researchers alike to use "class" to explain and predict people's material interests, lived experiences, living conditions, incomes, organizational capacities and willingness to engage in collective action, political leanings, and so on. In addition, he attempted to develop class categories that would allow researchers to compare and contrast the class structures and dynamics of different advanced capitalist and "post-capitalist" societies.

Wright has stressed the importance of:
 control over and exclusion from access to economic/productive resources;
 location within production relations;
 market capacity in exchange relations;
 differential control over income derived from the use of productive resources; and,
 differential control over labor effort in defining "class", while at the same time trying to account for the situation of expert, skilled, manager, and supervisory employees, taking inspiration from Weberian accounts of class and class analysis.

According to Wright, employees with sought-after and reward-inelastically supplied skills (due to natural scarcities or socially constructed and imposed restrictions on supply, such as licensing, barriers to entry into training programs, etc.) are in a "privileged [surplus] appropriation location within exploitation relations" because, while they are not capitalists, they are able to obtain more privileges through their relation to the owner of the means of production than less skilled workers and harder to monitor and evaluate in terms of labor effort. The owner(s) of the means of production or their employer in general therefore has to pay them a "scarcity" or "skill/credential" rent (thus raising their compensation above the actual cost of producing and reproducing their labor power) and tries to "buy" their loyalty by giving them ownership stakes, endowing them with delegated authority over their fellow workers and/or allowing them to more or less be autonomous in determining the pace and direction of their work. Thus, experts, managers of experts, and executive managers tend to be closer to the interests of the employers than to other workers.

Wright's books include Class Counts: Comparative Studies in Class Analysis (Cambridge, 1997), which uses data collected in various industrialized countries, including the United States, Canada, Norway, and Sweden. He was a professor of sociology at the University of Wisconsin–Madison until his death.

Real utopias 

Later in his career, Wright was associated with a renewed understanding of a socialist alternative, deeply rooted on social associative democracy. The transition to this alternative, according to Wright, depends on designing and building "real utopias", the name of a research project and book of his. They'd counter prevailing institutions by advancing democratic and egalitarian principles, thereby pointing in the direction of a more just and humane world. Examples include Wikipedia and the Mondragon Corporation. In his 2010 book Envisioning Real Utopias, Wright wrote an extensive case study about Wikipedia as an example of a social economy activity.

Bibliography

Books

Collected works 
 
This is part of the Real Utopias Project
 
 Wright wrote the preface for:  Wright is also the book series' editor.

Selected journal articles

See also 
 Theory of historical trajectory

References

Further reading 
 Politics & Society. Volume 48 Issue 4, December 2020. Special Issue: Remembering Erik Olin Wright (1947–2019): Scholar, Colleague, Friend.
Vivek Chibber, "Erik Olin Wright (1947–2019)," Jacobin, January 24, 2019.
 Adam Szetela, "Remembering Erik Olin Wright," Dissent, January 23, 2019.

External links 

 
 'A Rough Guide to Utopia', review of Envisioning Real Utopias in the Oxonian Review, November 2010
 'Real Men Find Real Utopias', review of Envisioning Real Utopias in Dissent, Winter 2011
 'Conversation with Peter Shea at University of Minnesota, 2007'

1947 births
2019 deaths
Alumni of Balliol College, Oxford
American Marxists
American sociologists
Harvard College alumni
Jewish American social scientists
Jewish sociologists
Marxist theorists
New Left
People from Madison, Wisconsin
UC Berkeley College of Letters and Science alumni
University of Wisconsin–Madison faculty
Writers from Berkeley, California
Utopian studies scholars
Deaths from cancer in Wisconsin
Deaths from acute myeloid leukemia